Julian Bellamy is managing director of ITV Studios.

Career
Bellamy began his career as a freelance assistant producer working on ITV's World in Action and The Big Story, and Channel 4's Dispatches. He was appointed editor of current affairs at Channel 4 in 1998. He spent eight years at Channel 4, including commissioning editor of Big Brother from 2001, head of factual entertainment from February 2003, and head of E4 in 2005, before being appointed controller of BBC Three in 2006. He returned to Channel 4 to become head of programming in 2007, moving on to work for Discovery Communications and ITV.

The Jeremy Kyle Show controversy 
In June 2019, Bellamy appeared before the Digital, Culture, Media and Sport Committee to respond to criticism of the recently cancelled ITV production The Jeremy Kyle Show, which was axed followed the death of one of its participants. He appeared alongside Tom McLennan, who served as executive producer of the show, and Graham Stanier, head of the show's after care. All of them confirmed to the committee that they were unaware of the range of accuracy for lie detector tests, despite such tests being a key feature of the show. Paul Farrelly MP called the show "trash TV" and suggested that the makers of the show "should be ashamed of themselves".

References 

Living people
ITV people
BBC executives
BBC Three controllers
Year of birth missing (living people)